Polichna was a town of ancient Laconia, mentioned by Polybius.

Its site is located near the modern Poulithra.

References

Populated places in ancient Laconia
Former populated places in Greece